What the Stuarts Did for Us is a 2002 BBC documentary series that examines the impact of the Stuart period on modern society.

Episodes

Episode one: Desygner Livinge

Hart-Davis travels around Britain to introduce the idea and inventions of the Stuart Period in architecture and life-style.

 Neo-classical architecture was introduced to London by Inigo Jones and Christopher Wren following the Great Fire of London.
 The fountain pen was first mentioned in the diaries of Samuel Pepys and it allowed him to write on the move.
 Coffee houses drew people from far and wide with their pleasant smell and allowed sober social intercourse.
 Gyms were born from bell-ringing clubs with dumbbells invented for those that could not make it to the church towers.
 Colourfast dyes were created in Britain's first chemical works at Ravenscar when supplies of the mordant alum were cut off.
 The three-piece suit and necktie were created by Charles II as a political weapon in his war against France.

Episode two: The Applyance of Science

Hart-Davis travels around Britain to introduce the idea and inventions of the Stuart Period in science and engineering.

 Experimental science was introduced by the Lord Chancellor Francis Bacon who died inventing the frozen chicken.
 Properties of gases investigated by Robert Boyle and Richard Towneley led to Denis Papin's invention of the pressure cooker.
 The steam engine was invented by Thomas Newcomen to drain water from the coalmines of the Midlands.
 The pendulum clock based on Galileo's principles was invented by Christiaan Huygens and led to the establishment of GMT.
 Principia by Isaac Newton established three simple laws that revolutionised our view of the universe.

Episode three: The Organysed Isle

Hart-Davis travels around Britain to introduce the idea and inventions of the Stuart Period in economics and politics.

 The Union Flag was designed for King James who united the kingdoms of England and Scotland into Great Britain.
 Public transport was introduced to England by Captain Bailey who standardised fares and issued licences for London Hackney Carriage.
 Road signs and the first road atlas by John Ogilvy further revolutionised the transport system and standardised the mile.
 The seed drill allowed Jethro Tull to put his revolutionary new planting techniques into practice leading to modern agriculture.
 The Fire Office of Nicholas Barbon led to the development of the first professional fire service.
 The Bank of England founded by William Paterson led to the creation of paper money and the national debt.
 The constitutional monarchy introduced following the restoration of Charles II is the backbone of the UK's modern political system.

Episode four: Newe Worldes

Hart-Davis travels around Britain to introduce the idea and inventions of the Stuart Period in science and science-fiction.

 The microscope as refined by Robert Hook and Antonie van Leeuwenhoek allowed the microscopic world to be viewed in detail.
 The diving bell as refined by Edmund Halley allowed the investigation of the depths of the ocean.
 Lunar observations of John Wilkins based on the previous observations of Galileo challenged long held views of the heavens.
 The micrometer devised by William Gascoigne proved Johannes Kepler's theories of elliptical planetary motion.
 Science-fiction was developed through the imaginations of Cyrano de Bergerac and Bishop Francis Godwin.

External links
 

2002 British television series debuts
2002 British television series endings
2000s British documentary television series
2000s British television miniseries
BBC television documentaries about history during the 16th and 17th centuries
English-language television shows